Let the Record Show: A Political History of ACT UP New York, 1987–1993 is a 2021 oral history written by former ACT UP activist Sarah Schulman. Using 188 interviews conducted as part of the ACT UP Oral History Project, Schulman shows how the activist group was successful, due to its decentralized, dramatic actions, and emphasizes the contributions of people of color and women to the movement.

Summary

Schulman recounts different ACT UP members' experiences joining the movement and their contributions to large actions like Stop the Church and demonstrations in front of the Food and Drug Administration, New York Stock Exchange, and National Institutes of Health.

Reception
Let the Record Show was generally well-received, including starred reviews from Kirkus Reviews and Library Journal. Kirkus called the book "[v]ital, democratic truth-telling," and Library Journal noted, "This engaging, accessible book will find a wide audience among readers interested in activism from the ground up. It will also be a foundational document for historians for generations to come."

The critical reception to Let the Record Show has overall been positive, including a review The New Yorker. The New York Times's Parl Sehgal explains, "This is a book about the past, written in the fury of the present — in the midst of another epidemic — but its gaze is fixed on the future. Let the Record Show doesn’t seek to memorialize history but to ransack it, to seize what we might need." Rebecca Makkai's review in The New York Times Book Review called Let the Record Show "a masterpiece tome: part sociology, part oral history, part memoir, part call to arms".

Publishers Weekly's primarily positive review noted, "Readers less familiar with ACT UP may wish for a clearer explanation of its organizational structure and more narrative cohesion than Schulman provides. Still, her firsthand perspective and copious details provide a valuable testament to the courage and dedication of many unheralded activists."

Freelance writer Vicky Osterweil criticized Let the Record Show in a Jewish Currents article in fall 2021. In an otherwise positive review, Osterweil said that Schulman had not accurately represented the presence and influence of trans members of ACT UP. A separate Jewish Currents response to Osterweil's article said Osterweil had misrepresented why Schulman disputed the presence of Black trans activists at the Stop the Church action.

Electric Literature and NPR named Let the Record Show one of the best nonfiction books of 2021. Gay Times named it one of the best LBTQ Books of 2021, and NBC included it in their list of the 10 Most Notable LGBTQ Books of 2021.

References

Further reading

External links
ACT UP Oral History Project site

Oral history books
HIV/AIDS activism
Historiography of LGBT in New York City
History books about HIV/AIDS
Books about activism
2020s LGBT literature
LGBT literature in the United States
Farrar, Straus and Giroux books
2021 non-fiction books